is a railway station in Tenri, Nara, Japan, serving passengers traveling on Kintetsu (Kintesu Railway)'s Tenri Line.

Lines 
 Kintetsu Railway
 Tenri Line

Platforms and tracks

History
 Feb. 7, 1915—Senzai Station was opened by the Tenri Light Railway.
 1921—Acquired by the Osaka Electric Tramway.
 1922—The rail gauge was widen into 1,435mm.
 1941—Owned by the Kansai Express Railway that merged with the Sangu Express Railway.
 1944—Owned by the Kintetsu Railway that merged with the Nankai Railway
 Apr. 1, 2007—PiTaPa, a reusable contactless stored value smart card, has been available.

Nearby 
 Nara Prefectural Nikaido Senior High School

External links
 

Railway stations in Nara Prefecture